Yuri Pavlovich Shvets (born in Poltava 1902 – 1972) was a Soviet cinematic artist, famous for art and scenery especially of fantasy and science-fiction films.

As a youth, Shvets held several jobs, then studied at and graduated from both the Music and Drama Institute of Mykola Lysenko and the Arts Institute in Kiev
.

The scientific accuracy of Shvets' work was praised by the Russian rocket scientist Konstantin Tsiolkovsky when the two met in 1934.

Shvets did artwork for over fifty films, including:
 (1935) Kosmicheskiy reys (Cosmic Journey or Space flight)
 (1935) Novii Gulliver (The New Gulliver)
 (1959) Nebo Zovyot (The Sky Calls)
 (1951) Вселенная (Universe)
 (1965) Luna (Moon)
 (1968) Марс (Mars)

References 

1902 births
1972 deaths
Artists from Poltava
Soviet production designers
Science fiction artists
Ukrainian speculative fiction artists
Space artists
20th-century Ukrainian painters
20th-century Ukrainian male artists
Ukrainian male painters
Mass media people from Poltava